Blayney Townley-Balfour   (28 May 1769 – 22 December 1856) was an Irish politician and member of the Protestant Ascendancy.

The Townley-Balfours were an Irish branch of Clan Balfour. His grandfather, also named Blayney Townley-Balfour, was a member of the Irish House of Commons (MP) for Carlingford.  The grandson was MP for Belturbet in 1800. He owned a large flour mill outside Slane. He commissioned architect Francis Johnston to rebuild Townley Hall, the family seat between Drogheda and Slane. He was a magistrate for counties Louth and Meath, High Sheriff of Louth in 1792, and deputy Lord Lieutenant of Louth in 1852.

Blayney Townley-Balfour married Lady Florence Cole, daughter of William Cole, 1st Earl of Enniskillen; they had ten children. His eldest son, also Blayney Townley-Balfour (born 1799), was Governor of the Bahamas from 1833 to 1835.

Footnotes

References

Irish MPs 1798–1800
British governors of the Bahamas
Politicians from County Meath
Politicians from County Louth
1769 births
1856 deaths
High Sheriffs of County Louth
Members of the Parliament of Ireland (pre-1801) for County Cavan constituencies
Townley, Blayney